Sydney College can refer to more than one establishment:

Sydney College, Bath, a former prominent independent boys school in Somerset, England, now housing the Holburne Museum of Art
Sydney Grammar School, a grammar school in Sydney, New South Wales
Sydney College of the Arts
Sydney College of Divinity
Sydney College of Advanced Education